Alexander "Alex" Polinsky is an American actor. He is known for his role as Adam Powell on Charles in Charge. He is also the voice of Control Freak on Teen Titans (2003) and Teen Titans Go! (2013), Argit in the Ben 10 franchise, Dennis Lee on The Life and Times of Juniper Lee, and Darington in Blaze and the Monster Machines.

In 2018, he accused former costar Scott Baio of physically assaulting and verbally abusing him on the set of Charles in Charge.

Filmography

Animation

Film

Video games

References

External links 

Living people
American male child actors
American male television actors
American male video game actors
American male voice actors
Male actors from San Francisco
Year of birth missing (living people)
Place of birth missing (living people)